The president of Zambia is the head of state and the head of government of Zambia. The office was first held by Kenneth Kaunda following independence in 1964. Since 1991, when Kaunda left the presidency, the office has been held by seven others: Frederick Chiluba, Levy Mwanawasa, Rupiah Banda, Michael Sata, Edgar Lungu and the current president Hakainde Hichilema, who won the 2021 presidential election. In addition, acting president Guy Scott served in an interim capacity after the death of President Michael Sata.

Since 31 August 1991 the president is also the head of government, as the position of Prime Minister was abolished in the last months of Kaunda's presidential term following negotiations with opposition parties.
 
The president is elected for a term of five years. Since 1991, the officeholder has been restricted to two consecutive terms.

History

Northern Rhodesia
When the British colony of Northern Rhodesia was separated from Southern Rhodesia and British South Africa Company rule, the head of state was the British Monarch represented in the colony by the Governor of Northern Rhodesia who exercised executive power as head of state and government. In the 1964 Northern Rhodesian general election, the office of Prime Minister of Northern Rhodesia was created to become the head of government ahead of independence. On 19 May 1964, the Secretary of State for Commonwealth Relations Duncan Sandys announced that Northern Rhodesia would become independent under a President. The election for the first President would be held by secret ballot amongst the elected members of the Legislative Council.

Zambia
Upon independence and the renaming of the country as Zambia, Prime Minister Kenneth Kaunda was elected as the first President. The office of Prime Minister was also abolished making the presidency an executive post. Initially, the country would be governed as a multi-party democracy. However, following the African National Congress integrating with United National Independence Party (UNIP), President Kaunda announced that the Constitution of Zambia would be changed to turn the country into a one-party state in 1973 with UNIP as the only legal party with all others banned. Kaunda claimed this was done to discourage tribalism. However, the constitution also restored the office of Prime Minister as head of government. In the 1973 Zambian general election, voters were only able to vote for the UNIP sponsored Kaunda and their only options were to vote if they approved or rejected his candidacy.

Kaunda was re-elected unanimously at each election until 1991. During the 1980s, pressures increased for the multi-party ban to be rescinded. After negotiations with the Movement for Multi-Party Democracy (MMD) in 1990, President Kaunda signed a constitutional amendment legalising political parties other than UNIP. The office of Prime Minister was abolished again and the powers returned to the President. In the 1991 Zambian general election, Kaunda was defeated by the MMD's Frederick Chiluba. Kaunda agreed to hand over the presidency peacefully, becoming the second African leader to do so after Mathieu Kérékou of Benin.

In 1996, President Chiluba allegedly discovered a plot by members of UNIP to carry out a coup d'état and declared a state of emergency to arrest UNIP members. However the Supreme Court of Zambia declared the emergency declaration was not valid and lifted the state of emergency and released those arrested. Later in the year, Chiluba amended the constitution stating that only people who had one parent born in Zambia or Northern Rhodesia could run for president. This amendment was ostensibly targeted at blocking Kaunda from standing for president again as his parents had been born in Nyasaland (modern day Malawi).

Due to a two-term limit in the constitution, Levy Mwanawasa was selected by Chiluba as the MMD's candidate to succeed him. Mwanawasa won the 2001 Zambian general election but his victory was marred by accusations of electoral fraud by opposition parties. Following legal disputes, the Supreme Court eventually ruled in 2005 that though the poll was "flawed", there were not enough errors to justify overturning the result. Mwanawasa won re-election in 2006. He died in 2008 and was replaced by  Rupiah Banda. In the 2011 Zambian general election Rupiah was defeated by the Patriotic Front's (PF) Michael Sata.

Sata died in office in 2014. Accordingly, his Vice-President Guy Scott became president in an acting capacity. This made Scott the first white head of state of an African country since South Africa's F. W. de Klerk who left office in 1994 following the end of apartheid. However, because his parents were not born in Zambia, due to the constitution he was only able to act as president for 90 days and could not stand for election. At the 2015 Zambian presidential election, the PF's Edgar Lungu won the presidency and retained it a year later in the 2016 general election under the amended constitution.

There are four most notable changes affecting the presidency in this amendment assented to by Edgar Lungu  in January 2016, most of which are found in Part VII(7) of the constitution . Firstly, Article 100 Section 1 a) effectively removal the parental clause requiring presidential and vice presidential candidates to have at least one parent born in Zambia and the harmonisation of Presidential and Vice-presidential eligibility in Article 110 Section 2.  Secondly, Article 101 Sections 1, 2 3 (a & b) and 8 signalled the shift from a First-Past the Post system to a Two-round system in which over 50% of valid votes cast are required for a president to win. In the event that this does not happen a second round will be held within 37 days between the two leading candidates to which the 50% + 1 rule will determine the winner on that second round.  The third notable change is in the introduction of the running mate clause in Article 110 Sections 1, 2 and 3.  This saw the President and Vice President directly elected on the same ticket as opposed to before where the President who once elected appoints and dismisses  the vice president executively. Lastly, the fourth change was in Article 100 Section 1 j)  which requires an aspiring  presidential candidates to prove to have at least 100 registered voters in each of the ten provinces to succefully file for nominations with the Electoral Commission of Zambia. In 2020, Lungu attempted to change the constitution to allow the President to change electoral laws and take control of Zambia's monetary policy. However the controversial Bill 10 failed after the Parliament of Zambia did not vote in favour with the required 2/3 majority.

List of officeholders 
Political parties

Symbols

 Elected unopposed

† Died in office

Timeline

Rank by time in office

See also
First Lady of Zambia
Vice-President of Zambia
Governor of Northern Rhodesia
Prime Minister of Zambia
Lists of office-holders
List of current heads of state and government

References

External links
World Statesmen – Zambia

Zambia

Presidents
1964 establishments in Zambia